Rochebrune may refer to the following places in France:

 Rochebrune, Hautes-Alpes, a commune in the department of Hautes-Alpes
 Rochebrune, Drôme, a commune in the department of Drôme
 Pic de Rochebrune, a mountain of Cottian Alps
 Pic de Petit Rochebrune, a mountain of Cottian Alps
 Château de Rochebrune, historic castle in Charente, France

Rochebrune can also be a surname:
 Antoine de Rochebrune, French Roman Catholic priest
 Alphonse Trémeau de Rochebrune, French zoologist
 François Rochebrune, French soldier and Polish general who organized the Zouaves of Death
 Octave de Rochebrune (1824-1900), French painter, sculptor and etcher